Events from the year 1992 in Scotland.

Incumbents 

 Secretary of State for Scotland and Keeper of the Great Seal – Ian Lang

Law officers 
 Lord Advocate – Lord Fraser of Carmyllie; then Alan Rodger, Baron Rodger of Earlsferry
 Solicitor General for Scotland – Alan Rodger; then Thomas Dawson

Judiciary 
 Lord President of the Court of Session and Lord Justice General – Lord Hope
 Lord Justice Clerk – Lord Ross
 Chairman of the Scottish Land Court – Lord Elliott, then Lord Philip

Events 
 1 January – New Year's Day Storm sweeps across northern Scotland and western Norway. The original Bridge of Awe collapses.
 6 March – the Local Government Finance Act 1992, which will replace the Poll Tax with the Council Tax from April next year, receives the Royal Assent.
 9 April – The 1992 general election results in Labour winning 49 out of 72 seats in Scotland- a clear majority. However, the Conservative Party now led by Prime Minister John Major, with only eleven MPs in Scotland; wins a fourth consecutive term in government.
 9 May – Rangers F.C. beat Airdrieonians 2-1 to win the Scottish Cup, having already won their fourth consecutive league title.
June
University status granted to Napier University, The Robert Gordon University and the University of Paisley.
United States Navy Submarine Squadron 14 leaves Holy Loch.
Miller oilfield in the North Sea begins production.
 24 June – Ravenscraig steelworks, the largest hot strip steel mill in Western Europe, closes, ending steelmaking in Scotland.
 17 July – John Smith, MP for Monklands East, is elected as Leader of the Labour Party following the resignation of Neil Kinnock after 9 years in the role.
 6 August – Lord Hope, the Lord President of the Court of Session, Scotland's most senior judge, permits the televising of appeals in both criminal and civil cases, the first time that cameras have been allowed into courts in the United Kingdom.

Undated 

University of the Highlands and Islands established as a Millennium Institute.
University of St Andrews appoints its first female professor, Ursula Martin as Professor of Computer Science.
Monktonhall Colliery at Newcraighall becomes a worker cooperative.
Publication of The Third Statistical Account of Scotland concludes with the volume for Roxburghshire.
The Cadenza choir is formed in Edinburgh.

Births 
 23 March – Blair Alston, footballer
 30 March – Stuart Armstrong, footballer
 21 May – Lisa Evans, footballer
 21 June – Carly Booth, golfer
 23 August – Nicola Docherty, footballer
 17 September – Stuart Bannigan, footballer

Deaths 
 4 May – Gregor Mackenzie, Labour politician (born 1927)
 27 June – Bessie Watson, child suffragette and piper (born 1900)
 23 August – Donald Stewart, Scottish National Party politician (born 1920)

The arts
 March – Duncan McLean's short story collection Bucket of Tongues is published.
 August – Scottish Television begins the Gaelic language soap opera Machair, set and filmed on Lewis.
 10 August – James MacMillan's concerto for percussion and orchestra Veni, Veni, Emmanuel, commissioned by Christian Salvesen for Evelyn Glennie is premiered by her with the Scottish Chamber Orchestra at The Proms in the Royal Albert Hall, London.
Alasdair Gray's novel Poor Things is published.
Andrew Greig's novel Electric Brae is published.
Rebel Inc. is first published as a counter-cultural literary magazine in Edinburgh by Kevin Williamson.
Birlinn (publisher) established in Edinburgh.

See also 
 1992 in Northern Ireland

References 

 
Scotland
Years of the 20th century in Scotland
1990s in Scotland